The 2014 World Weightlifting Championships were held in Baluan Sholak Sports Palace, Almaty, Kazakhstan. The event took place from November 8 to 16, 2014.

Medal summary

Men

Women

Medal table
Ranking by Big (Total result) medals
 

Ranking by all medals: Big (Total result) and Small (Snatch and Clean & Jerk)

Team ranking

Men

Women

Participating nations
A total of 526 competitors from 71 nations participated.

 (9)
 (6)
 (1)
 (14)
 (7)
 (1)
 (6)
 (14)
 (1)
 (10)
 (8)
 (7)
 (3)
 (15)
 (12)
 (15)
 (4)
 (3)
 (1)
 (5)
 (1)
 (4)
 (10)
 (13)
 (4)
 (6)
 (10)
 (6)
 (13)
 (7)
 (7)
 (12)
 (11)
 (11)
 (8)
 (2)
 (2)
 (10)
 (15)
 (15)
 (4)
 (2)
 (1)
 (1)
 (6)
 (2)
 (2)
 (5)
 (9)
 (5)
 (1)
 (12)
 (1)
 (13)
 (1)
 (7)
 (14)
 (8)
 (5)
 (11)
 (14)
 (15)
 (13)
 (5)
 (1)
 (13)
 (1)
 (15)
 (12)
 (13)
 (5)

References

Results Book 
Results

External links
Official website
IWRP 

 
2014
World Weightlifting Championships
World Weightlifting Championships
World Weightlifting Championships
International weightlifting competitions hosted by Kazakhstan